is a district located in Okayama Prefecture, Japan.

As of 2003, the district has an estimated population of 20,631 and a population density of 33.22 persons per km2. The total area is 621.03 km2.

Towns and villages
Kagamino

Merger
On February 28, 2005 the town of Kamo, and the village of Aba merged into the city of Tsuyama.
On March 1, 2005 the town of Okutsu, and the villages of Kamisaibara and Tomi were merged into the expanded town of Kagamino.

See also
Tomata Dam

Districts in Okayama Prefecture